The University of Notre Dame Press is a university press that is part of the University of Notre Dame in Notre Dame, Indiana, United States. The press was founded in 1949, and is the largest Catholic university press in the world.

The University of Notre Dame Press is currently a member of the Association of University Presses, to which it was admitted in 1959. Domestic distribution for the press is currently provided by the University of North Carolina Press's Longleaf Services.

See also

 List of English-language book publishing companies
 List of university presses

References

External links
University of Notre Dame Press

Notre Dame, University of
Press
Book publishing companies based in Indiana
1949 establishments in Indiana